The Stud is a 1978 British drama film directed by Quentin Masters and starring Joan Collins and Oliver Tobias. It is based on the 1969 novel of the same name by Collins' younger sister Jackie Collins.

Joan had asked her sister Jackie for the film rights for free and Jackie agreed whilst contributing to the screenplay. Joan met producer Brent Walker at the Cannes Film festival in 1977. He became excited by the project as it was proposed as a British alternative to Saturday Night Fever. Both Joan Collins' husband, Ron Kass, and Jackie Collins' husband, Oscar Lerhman, also acted as producers on the project.

Plot
Fontaine Khaled  (Joan Collins) is the London wife of a wealthy Arab businessman. She spends his money on her nightclub, Hobo, and her rather hedonistic partying lifestyle. She hires a handsome manager, Tony (Oliver Tobias), to run her club, but it is understood that his job security is dependent on his satisfying her nymphomaniac demands. Tony loses interest in Fontaine, as she treats him like a plaything, and turns his attention to her young stepdaughter Alexandra Khaled (Emma Jacobs), who uses him to get back at Fontaine after she discovers a video tape of Fontaine and Tony having sex in the Khaleds' private elevator, cheating on her father. Fontaine then dumps Tony and is divorced by her husband for adultery.

Cast

 Joan Collins as Fontaine Khaled
 Oliver Tobias as Tony Blake
 Sue Lloyd as Vanessa Grant
 Walter Gotell as Benjamin Khaled
 Mark Burns as Leonard Grant
 Doug Fisher as Sammy
 Emma Jacobs as Alex Khaled
 Peter Lukas as Ian Thane
 Natalie Ogle as Maddy
 Constantin De Goguel as Lord Newton
 Guy Ward as Peter
 Sarah Lawson as Anne Khaled
 Jeremy Child as Lawyer
 Peter Dennis as Marc
 Chris Jagger as Rock star
 Peter Bourke as Gordon
 Tania Rogers as Janine
 Felicity Buirski as Deborah
 Minah Bird as Molly
 Sharon Fussey as Denise
 Hilda Fenemore as Mrs Blake
 Bernard Stone as Mr Blake
 John Conteh as himself
 Milo Sperber as Kamara (uncredited)
 Suzanne Danielle as Disco dancer (uncredited)
 Susie Silvey as Girl in shower (uncredited)

Production
Joan Collins said she was drunk during the orgy scene.

Reception

Box Office
Made for $600,000 (US), the film netted over $20,000,000 internationally. The film was one of the most popular movies of 1978 at the British box office.

Legacy
The film helped to revitalise Joan Collins' career and she credits The Stud and its sequel The Bitch (1979) with bringing her to the attention of Aaron Spelling and Esther Shapiro, the producers of Dynasty in 1981. However, Tobias later claimed that his part in the film led to typecasting and ruined his career.

Soundtrack
A successful soundtrack album was released on Ronco Records to tie-in with the film. The album contained twenty tracks, including original material penned by Biddu specifically for the film, as well as a number of major British chart hits which were licensed for use in the film. The majority of the tracks were disco flavoured, although some non-disco tracks were also included.  The album rose to number 2 on the UK albums chart, kept off the top spot by the Saturday Night Fever soundtrack album.  

Soundtrack album track list:

Side One

1. The Biddu Orchestra – "The Stud" 
2. Michael Zager Band – "Let's All Chant"
3. Samantha Sang – "Emotion"
4. The Real Thing – "Let's Go Disco"
5. Baccara – "Sorry, I'm a Lady"
6. Rod Stewart – "You Wear It Well"
7. Odyssey – "Native New Yorker"
8. K.C. and the Sunshine Band – "That's the Way (I Like It)"
9. Linda Lewis – "It's Good"
10.Space – "Deliverance"

Side Two

1. Leo Sayer – "Moonlighting"
2. Tina Charles – "Fire Down Below"
3. Manfred Mann's Earth Band – "Davey's On The Road Again"
4. 10cc – "I'm Not in Love"
5. Rose Royce – "Car Wash"
6. David Soul – "Silver Lady"
7. Goldie – "Making Up Again"
8. Patti Smith Group – "Because The Night"
9. Bill Fredericks – "Almost"
10.Heatwave – The Groove Line"

References

Bibliography
Simon Sheridan Keeping the British End Up: Four Decades of Saucy Cinema, Titan Books (fourth edition, 2011)

External links

1978 films
1970s erotic drama films
British erotic drama films
Films based on British novels
Films set in London
1978 drama films
1970s English-language films
Films scored by Biddu
Films directed by Quentin Masters
1970s British films